Erin Reed may refer to:

Erin Reed, figure skater in the 2007 U.S. Figure Skating Championships
Erin Reed (Haven), later called Charlotte Cross, a character from Haven
Erin Reed, actress in Sister Kate (TV series)
Erin Reed, assistant professor of organizational behavior at the Questrom School of Business